Madushanka or Madhushanka is a Sinhalese surname that may refer to the following notable Sri Lankan cricketers:
Ashan Madhushanka (born 1996) 
Buddika Madushanka (born 1992)
Dananja Madushanka 
Danushka Madushanka (born 1990) 
Dilshan Madushanka (born 2000) 
Imesh Madushanka (born 1998) 
Kanishka Madhushanka (born 1997) 
Kasun Madushanka (born 1991) 
Lahiru Madushanka (born 1992)
Lakshan Madushanka (born 1990) 
Madura Madushanka (born 1994) 
Navod Madushanka Weeratunga (born 1996) 
Nimanda Madushanka (born 1992) 
Shehan Madushanka (born 1995) 
Supun Madushanka (born 1993) 
Thushara Madushanka (born 1993)

See also
Madusanka (disambiguation)

Sinhalese surnames